Football Club d'Échirolles is a French association football club founded in 1949. They are based in Échirolles, near Grenoble in Isère, France and are currently playing in the Ligue Auvergne-Rhône-Alpes, the 6th tier of French football. They play at the Stade Eugène Thénard in Échirolles.

FC Échirolles has reached the 7th round of the Coupe de France on several occasions, most notably suffering a 4–1 defeat to Olympique de Marseille in the 1995–96 edition.

Honours
Championnat de DH Rhône-Alpes: 2000-01, 2004–05, 2010–11
Coupe Rhône-Alpes: 2004-05

References

Association football clubs established in 1949
Sport in Isère
1949 establishments in France
Football clubs in Auvergne-Rhône-Alpes